Shaoyaoju Station is a station on Line 10 and Line 13 of the Beijing Subway.

Station layout 
The line 10 station has an underground island platform. The line 13 station has 2 ground-level side platforms.

Exits 
There are 5 exits, lettered A, B, E, F, and G. Exits B and E are accessible.

Gallery

External links

Beijing Subway stations in Chaoyang District
Railway stations in China opened in 2003
Railway stations in China opened in 2008